The women's heptathlon event at the 1981 Summer Universiade was held at the Stadionul Naţional in Bucharest on 21 and 22 July 1981. It was the first time that this event was contested at the Universiade replacing the pentathlon.

Results

References

Athletics at the 1981 Summer Universiade
1981